Quandre Mosely (born May 8, 1999) is an American football cornerback for the New England Patriots of the National Football League (NFL). He played college football at Eastern Arizona College and the University of Kentucky. He played two seasons at the junior college level before joining Kentucky in 2019.

Professional career

Dallas Cowboys
After going undrafted in the 2022 NFL draft, Mosley signed with the Dallas Cowboys in May 2022 as a free agent. He was waived by the Cowboys in August 2022.

Seattle Seahawks
Mosely worked out for the Philadelphia Eagles before signing with the Seattle Seahawks practice squad. He was released on October 4.

Tampa Bay Buccaneers
On October 12, 2022, Mosely was signed to the Tampa Bay Buccaneers practice squad. He was released on November 29.

New England Patriots
On December 5, 2022, Mosely was signed to the New England Patriots practice squad. He signed a reserve/future contract on January 10, 2023.

References

External links
New England Patriots bio
Kentucky Wildcats bio

1999 births
Living people
American football cornerbacks
Kentucky Wildcats football players
Seattle Seahawks players
Tampa Bay Buccaneers players
New England Patriots players